This is the discography for American electronic dance music band Krewella.

Studio albums

Extended plays

Singles

As lead artist

As featured artist

Guest Appearances

Remixes

DJ Mixes
Troll Mixes
 2012 Troll Mix Vol. 1: Fuck Finals Edition
 2013 Troll Mix Vol. 2: Road to Ultra
 2013 Troll Mix Vol. 3: Makeout Edition
 2013 Troll Mix Vol. 4: Get Ripped or Die Trying
 2013 Troll Mix Vol. 5: Get Wet Edition
 2013 Troll Mix Vol. 6: Trick or Troll Edition
 2013 Troll Mix Vol. 7: Jingle Troll Rock
 2013 Troll Mix Vol. 8: Happy Krew Year
 2014 Troll Mix Vol. 9: Just The Tip *Valentine's Day Edition*
 2014 Troll Mix Vol. 10: Pre-Game Edition
 2014 Troll Mix Vol. 11: Road to Coachella
 2014 Troll Mix Vol. 12: To 150 BPM & Beyond
 2014 Troll Mix Vol. 13: Sex on the Dance Floor
 2015 Troll Mix Vol. 14: Return of the Trolls
 2016 Troll Mix Vol. 15: Sweatbox Edition
 2017 Troll Mix Vol. 16: Winter Remedy Mix
 2017 Troll Mix Vol. 17: Weekend Warriors
 2017 Troll Mix Vol. 18: Troll Mix & Chill
 2017 Troll Mix Vol. 19: New World Tour Pre-game Mix
 2017 Troll Mix Vol. 20: dead af edition
 2019 Troll Mix Vol. 21: Spooky Season 2019
 2020 Troll Mix Vol. 22: Quarantine Vibe Check
 2021 Troll Mix Vol. 23: Only Trolls Fall In Love

References

Discographies of American artists
Electronic music discographies